Macrocheles hamatus is a species of mite in the family Macrochelidae.

References

hamatus
Articles created by Qbugbot
Animals described in 1915